This is a list of electoral results for the Electoral division of Casuarina in Northern Territory elections.

Members for Casuarina

Election results

Elections in the 1970s

Totals for individual Independent candidates not known

Elections in the 1980s

 Preferences were not distributed.

Elections in the 1990s

Elections in the 2000s

Elections in the 2010s

Elections in the 2020s

References

Northern Territory electoral results by district